British Columbia Lacrosse Association (BCLA) is a sanctioning body in British Columbia, Canada. Empowered by the Canadian Lacrosse Association, the BCLA controls and regulates Minor level, Junior and Senior level box lacrosse and field lacrosse in the province.

Box lacrosse leagues
Senior
Western Lacrosse Association (Senior A)
West Coast Senior Lacrosse Association (Senior B)
Prince George Senior Lacrosse League (Senior C)
Thompson Okanagan Senior Lacrosse League (Senior C)
Vancouver Island Senior Lacrosse League (Senior C)
West Central Lacrosse League (Senior C)

Junior
British Columbia Junior A Lacrosse League
Pacific Northwest Junior Lacrosse League (Junior B)
Thompson Okanagan Junior Lacrosse League (Junior B)
West Coast Junior Lacrosse League (Junior B)

Senior C 
Teams from the four BCLA Senior C leagues compete in a post-season provincial championship for the Fred Doig Cup. The award for Most Sportsmanlike Team receive the Dorothy Robertson Trophy.

Select teams compete in an invitational tournament hosted by a member team. Tournament winners are awarded the Treasure Cove Trophy.

When the tournaments coincide, teams which compete for the Fred Doig Cup are allowed just three pickup players.

Leadership 
Executive Director: Rochelle Winterton

Technical Director: Dave Showers

Marketing Director: Jeff Gombar

Administrative Assistant: Deb Heard

References

External links
British Columbia Lacrosse Association
Prince George Senior Lacrosse League
Victoria Senior Lacrosse League

Lac
Lacrosse governing bodies of Canada